World Dance New York is a US home entertainment company, releasing and distributing special interest titles on DVD, video on demand, streaming media, iPhone and iPad apps, and a brand of women's dance and fitness home video products. It was founded in 2001 as "Stratostream - World Dance New York". "Stratostream" designates the company in the business-to-business environment, the home video industry, while "World Dance New York" is the publicly-recognized brand and the name of the consumer-facing operation of the company.

History

World Dance New York was founded by New York-based entertainment entrepreneur Neon (dancer) to respond to the demand for instruction and fitness programs based on women’s solo dance forms. The rising popularity of fitness and self-help home video and interest in creative fitness (as opposed to traditional gym-style programs) among women called for a wider range of movement disciplines and dance forms adapted for home video use. The first video releases by World Dance New York focused on belly dance and offered beginner instruction and workout programs for mass-market distribution and in-depth training programs for dance professionals.

In the years following the creation of the company, it established lines of video instruction and workout products for women in a number of solo dance forms, including belly dance, stiletto dance, hip-hop dance, Brazilian samba, Flamenco, Bollywood dance, burlesque, exotic dance, go-go dancing, fire dance, hoop dance, capoeira, women’s self-defense, and prenatal (maternity) fitness. 
It also started releasing instructional and workout products adapting partner dance styles such as salsa (dance) to solo practice and performance, and added titles featuring traditional fitness disciplines, such as strength and flexibility at-home workouts for women, as well as yoga, Pilates, and stretching programs.

Non-movement categories in the World Dance New York catalog include alternative modeling, styling, hair and makeup (fantasy, pin-up girl and vintage), and esoteric arts.

Sample home video series by genre

Belly dance fitness
The Bellydance Core Fitness Workout with Ayshe
The Bellydance Rhythms Workout with Neon
The Bellydance Shimmy Workout with Sarah Skinner
Celebration - The Bellydance Workout with Sarah Skinner
Cocktail  - The Bellydance Workout with Tanna Valentine
Hard Candy - The Bellydance Workout with Neon
Liquid Gold - Bellydance Fluid Movement Workout with Neon
Love Potion - The Bellydance Workout with Neon
Luscious - The Bellydance Workout with Neon
Piece of Cake - The Bellydance Workout with Neon
Silk - The Bellydance Veil Workout with Tanna Valentine
The Tribal Fusion Bellydance Workout with Irina Akulenko
"Instant Bellydancer" with Neon

Stiletto Dance 
Stiletto Dance: Music Video Style with Dana Foglia
Thrills in High Heels - Stiletto Dance: Nightclub Style with Lady Morrighan
Stiletto Dance: Sensual Style with Neon

Brazilian samba instruction and fitness
The Brazilian Carnival Workout with Qiuenia Ribeiro
The Cardio Samba Workout with Qiuenia Ribeiro
Dance Today! Samba with Qiuenia Ribeiro
The Samba Reggae Workout with Qiuenia Ribeiro

Flamenco dance instruction
Dance Today! Flamenco with Puela Lunaris
Flamenco is Hot! (campanilleros) with Puela Lunaris
Flamenco: You Can Do It! (sevillanas) with Puela Lunaris

Solo salsa dance instruction and fitness
Salsa Dance Fitness Party with Yesenia Adame
Salsa... Solo! with Yesenia Adame
Sexy Salsa with Yesenia Adame

Burlesque dance instruction
Best Assets! The Burlesque Booty Workout with Gal Friday & Peekaboo Pointe
Burlesque Chair Dance: Technique & Choreography with Jo Weldon
Honey & Spice: Sensual & Fierce Burlesque with Jo Weldon
Refined Sugar - Burlesque Dance with Katalin Schäfer
Rock Bottom: The Burlesque Booty Workout with Peekaboo Pointe, Gal Friday
Silk & Feathers: Burlesque Fan Dance with Jo Weldon
Stripper Housewife - Burlesque Routines & Recipes for Stage & Kitchen with Peekaboo Pointe
Striptease for Burlesque, Exotic Dance & Every Day with Jo Weldon

Tribal fusion belly dance
Android Goddess: Tribal Fusion Belly Dance, Robotic Movement with Fayzah
Belly Dance Pop & Lock: Tribal Fusion Bellydance / Hip-Hop with Elisheva
Contemporary Bellydance & Yoga with Ariellah Aflalo
East Coast Tribal Bellydance with Sera Solstice
Fluid Tribal Belly Dance: Swirling Waves, Isolations, Hits & Breaks with Fayzah
Foundations of Belly Dance: East Coast Tribal  with Sera Solstice
Lunar Bellydance: East Coast Tribal with Sera Solstice
Modern Tribal Bellydance with Asharah 
Serpentine: Belly Dance with Rachel Brice 
Solar Bellydance: East Coast Tribal with Sera Solstice
Tribaret Bellydance: Technique & Combinations with Carrie Konyha
Fluid Precision - Contemporary Tribal Bellydance with Kassar

Fantasy and Gothic belly dance
Fantasy Bellydance
Fantasy Bellydance: Desire
Fantasy Bellydance: Magic
Fantasy Bellydance: Mystery
Gothic Bellydance
Gothic Bellydance - Revelations

Hip-hop and hip-hop/belly dance fusion
Belly Dance - Hip-Hop: Liquid Fusion with Anasma
Street Fusion! Street Jazz & Hip Hop Dance with Karen Gayle
Urban Jam! Hip Hop Dance, 3 Routines: beginner-to-advanced with Laya Barak 
Wave Explosion! Belly Dance - Hip-Hop Liquid Fusion with Anasma
Waves of the Future: Hip-Hop & House Dance with Future

See also 
 home video
 Neon (dancer)

References

External links 
 World Dance New York website
 World Dance New York YouTube Channel

Home video companies of the United States
Film distributors of the United States
Film production companies of the United States
2001 establishments in New York City